Beaudry is a Montreal Metro station in the borough of Ville-Marie, in Montreal, Quebec, Canada. It is operated by the Société de transport de Montréal (STM) and serves the Green Line. It is in Montreal's Gay Village, part of the Centre-Sud district. Although part of the original network of the Metro, it opened two months after the rest of the network, on December 21, 1966.

Overview 

Designed by Adalbert Niklewicz, it is a normal side platform station, built in-tunnel; a transept leads to a long inclined moving sidewalk, the only one of its kind in the Metro, traversing the distance between De Maisonneuve Boulevard and Saint Catherine Street, on which the entrance is located. The moving sidewalk has been a burden to the STM because it is unique and so replacement parts must be custom-built.

The walls in the entrance building, ticket hall, passage to the platforms, and transept area were updated in a stylish light slate blue and stainless steel scheme. The platform is covered in a cream-and-brown tile pattern, but in 1999, part of the walls near the exits were redone during renovations into a pattern of blue tiles and stainless steel.

Renovations

In October 2018, the station was temporarily closed for renovations for 8 months, as part of a significant renovation that would take 18 months to complete fully. Unlike at Honoré-Beaugrand and the adjacent Berri-UQAM, which remained partly or wholly open during their recent renovations, "a complete closure was necessary" for the renovations to take place, according to STM spokesperson Amélie Régis, as the station only had a sole entrance. Beaudry's closure was the first time that a metro station closed completely for renovations since Beaubien station closed for four months in the spring of 2015. Shuttle buses were provided during the closure to facilitate transport between the station and its two neighbouring stations, Berri-UQAM and Papineau.

The station reopened, as scheduled, on June 3, 2019. Since then, work has been continued to replace the wall on the platform. The renovation has been completed in 2020.

Architecture and art 
The station was renovated and partially redecorated in the Réno-Métro program in 1999. Part of this work included a large new glassed-in entrance building by Béïque, Thuot, and Legault; a unique part of its design are rainbow-coloured masts over the door, an homage to Montreal's large gay and lesbian neighbourhood, the Village (Village gai), which the station serves. These were created by Jacques Thibault.

Origin of the name
The station is named for Beaudry Street. Pierre Beaudry (1774–1848) was the landowner across whose farm the street was opened; he also donated the land on which the Saint-Pierre-Apôtre Church was built.

Connecting bus routes

Nearby points of interest
 The Village
 Maison Radio-Canada
 Écomusée du fier monde
 Hôpital Notre-Dame

References

External links

 Beaudry Metro Station - official site
 Montreal by Metro, metrodemontreal.com - photos, information, and trivia

Green Line (Montreal Metro)
Railway stations in Canada opened in 1966
Centre-Sud